Racquel Vasquez (1969/1970) is the mayor of the city of Lemon Grove, California, the first African-American women elected mayor in San Diego County.

Biography
Vasquez was born in Los Angeles and raised in Gardena, California. In 1994, she graduated with a Bachelor of Arts in Management of Radio, TV&Film from California State University, Northridge. After school, she worked as a promotion specialist for the city of Newport News, Virginia and in 2000, she accepted a position as a public information officer for the city of San Diego. In 2007, she was appointed as Planning Commissioner in Lemon Grove. On November 6, 2012, she was elected to the City Council of Lemon Grove. After 20-year incumbent mayor Mary Sessom retired, she entered the 2016 mayoral race. In November 2016, she was elected mayor, defeating fellow City Councilman George Gastil and medical credentialing specialist Teresa Rosiak. She was sworn in on December 20, 2016. Running on a platform of fiscal responsibility, she was able to balance the budget in 2019, the first time in many years. On November 3, 2020, she was re-elected as mayor with 38% of the vote defeating Jerry Jones (32.50%), Kamaal Martin (20.25%), and Christopher Williams (9.22%).

She is the recipient of the President's Volunteer Service Award.

Personal life
Vasquez is married to Navy veteran Jose Vasquez; they have two daughters.

Work 
Main roles have included:
1997-99: Promotion Specialist at City of Newport News
from April 2000: Senior Public Information Officer at City of San Diego
from December 2016: Mayor of Lemon Grove, California.

References

External links 
Official website

California State University, Northridge alumni
People from Lemon Grove, California
African-American mayors in California
Year of birth missing (living people)
Living people
21st-century African-American people
African-American women mayors